Surriya Khanum  also spelled as Suraiya Khanum is a veteran Pakistani folk and classical singer from the Punjab. She is also known for her soulful performances and singing Sufi music on Pakistan Television and other TV channels.

Career
Suraiya Khanum started her singing career on Radio Pakistan's Radio Multan in Multan, Pakistan in 1977. She was musically influenced by Ustad Muhammad Juman. Ustad Nusrat Fateh Ali Khan trained her for 8 years and she was also formally trained by Ustad Faiz Ahmed for 21 years. Musically, she is inspired by the veteran folk singer Tufail Niazi as well as Reshma and Iqbal Bano.
She appeared as a featured artist on the eighth season of popular music reality television series Coke Studio Pakistan. She sang a popular wedding song also sung earlier by veteran folk singer Tufail Niazi "Chirya Da Chamba" along with Anwar Maqsood which was praised for its music, composition and the beautiful narration of a letter by Anwar Maqsood. It was stated that the song "created a memorable experience for the audience".

Discography

singles
 MenDa Ishq Vi Toon  (a Kafi song written by the 19th century Sufi poet Khawaja Ghulam Farid). This folk song has a long history and was also sung earlier by Inayat Hussain Bhatti and Pathanay Khan
 Toonba – Turr Multanon Toonba Aaya
 Raataan Jaagni Aan
 Yaar Toon Kithay Vain
 Way Main Chori Chori Tere Naal La Layyan Akhhaan Wey (a Punjabi song written by the poet Manzoor Hussain Jhalla)
 Ramzaan KehRay Velay Laaiyan
 Mera Chann Masta
 Bhul Jaania Kisay De Naal Pyaar Na
 Saaiyaan
 Bol Mitti Daya Baawia (folk song originally sung by Alam Lohar)

Coke Studio (Pakistan)
 "'Chiryan Da Chamba''" (2015) (song performance also features a reading by Anwar Maqsood)

This above folk song is about the parting of a father and his daughter at her wedding. The departing daughter is reminiscing about the time she spent at her family home.

A major Pakistani English-language newspaper comments about above Coke Studio performance, "While the music is minimal and good enough to form its bedrock, Khanum's command on singing is intimidating."

References

External links
 Surriya Khanum Profile at Coke Studio Pakistan

Living people
Pakistani ghazal singers
Punjabi people
Pakistani playback singers
Pakistani classical singers
Performers of Sufi music
Pakistani folk singers
Women ghazal singers
Coke Studio (Pakistani TV program)
Year of birth missing (living people)
 20th-century Pakistani women singers